Cycloramphus lutzorum is a species of frog in the family Cycloramphidae. It is endemic to Brazil. Its natural habitats are subtropical or tropical moist lowland forest, rivers, and rocky areas.
It is threatened by habitat loss.

References

lutzorum
Endemic fauna of Brazil
Amphibians of Brazil
Taxonomy articles created by Polbot
Amphibians described in 1983